The Albanian National Council (Montenegrin: Nacionalni Savjet Albanaca) is an institution of self governance for the Albanian minority in Montenegro. The council was founded in 2008 in Ulcinj.

The council has 12 permanent commissions:
Commission for provisions
Commission for cooperation with Albanians in other countries
Commission for state relations
Commission for education
Commission for information
Commission for official use of Albanian language
Commission for culture
Commission for finances and economy
Commission for space planning
Commission for tourism, sport and environment
Commission for agriculture
Commission for appeals

Notes 

Ulcinj
 Albanian National Council
Ethnic organisations based in Montenegro